Our Lady's Church may refer to:

 Church of Our Lady
 St. Mary's Church

Single examples:
 St. Mary's or Our Lady's Church, Glendalough

It is also the translation of church names in other languages:
 Notre Dame (disambiguation)
 Nuestra Señora (disambiguation)
 Liebfrauenkirche (disambiguation)
 Frauenkirche (disambiguation)